Politely is an album by American jazz trumpeter Bill Hardman which was recorded in 1981 and released on the Muse label the following year.

Reception

The AllMusic review by Scott Yanow stated, "This quintet date is very much in the bop vein. Despite its title, much of the session is actually hard driving".

Track listing
 "Love Letters" (Victor Young, Edward Heyman) − 6:00
 "Politely" (Bill Hardman) − 6:14
 "Lazybird" (John Coltrane) − 6:15
 "Coral Keys" (Walter Bishop Jr.) − 9:47
 "Smooch" (Charles Mingus, Miles Davis) − 8:20

Personnel 
Bill Hardman − trumpet
Junior Cook − tenor saxophone
Walter Bishop Jr. − piano 
Paul Brown − bass
Leroy Williams − drums

References 

1982 albums
Bill Hardman albums
Albums produced by Bob Porter (record producer)
Albums recorded at Van Gelder Studio
Muse Records albums